Kasper Degn is a Danish professional ice hockey player who participated at the 2010 IIHF World Championship as a member of the Denmark National men's ice hockey team.

Career statistics

References

1982 births
AaB Ishockey players
Aalborg Pirates players
Danish ice hockey forwards
Herning Blue Fox players
Living people
Nordsjælland Cobras players
SC Bietigheim-Bissingen players